Beldenville is an unincorporated community located in Pierce County, Wisconsin, United States. Beldenville is located on Wisconsin Highway 65 north of Ellsworth. Beldenville has a post office with ZIP code 54003.

History
A post office has been in operation at Beldenville since 1858. The community was named for A. Belden, the owner of a local mill.

References

Unincorporated communities in Pierce County, Wisconsin
Unincorporated communities in Wisconsin